Károly Janza (11 April 1914 – 21 June 2001) was a Hungarian military officer and politician, who served as Minister of Defence during the Hungarian Revolution of 1956. He tried to get the insurgents to the capitulation but he could not achieve this.

References

External links
 Károly Janza

1914 births
2001 deaths
Politicians from Budapest
Hungarian soldiers
Defence ministers of Hungary
Hungarian communists